Challhuahuacho (Quechua: Challwa Wachu, meaning 'fish ridge') is one of the six districts of the province Cotabambas in Peru. The town has 4,000 inhabitants with another 10,000 in the surrounding area of Challhuahuacho.

Geography 
Other mountains are listed below:

Ethnic groups 
The people in the district are mainly indigenous citizens of Quechua descent. Quechua is the language which the majority of the population (87.57%) learnt to speak in childhood, 12.11% of the residents started speaking using the Spanish language (2007 Peru Census).

References

Districts of the Cotabambas Province
Districts of the Apurímac Region